Emmanuel Boislèvé (21 December 1884 – 6 August 1921) was a French gymnast. He competed in the men's artistic individual all-around event at the 1908 Summer Olympics.

References

1884 births
1921 deaths
French male artistic gymnasts
Olympic gymnasts of France
Gymnasts at the 1908 Summer Olympics
Place of birth missing
20th-century French people